Klinikum Nord station is a Nuremberg U-Bahn station which opened on 22 May 2017 and serves the line U3.

References

Nuremberg U-Bahn stations
Railway stations in Germany opened in 2017